The France – Solomon Islands Maritime Delimitation Agreement is a 1990 treaty in which France and the Solomon Islands agreed to a maritime boundary between the Solomon Islands and the French territory of New Caledonia.

The treaty was signed in Honiara on 12 November 1990. The text of the treaty is brief and sets out a boundary of three straight-line maritime segments defined by four individual coordinate points. The boundary runs roughly east to west and represents an approximate equidistant line between New Caledonia and the Solomon Islands.

The treaty came into force on the day it was signed. The full name of the treaty is Agreement on maritime delimitation between the Government of the French Republic and the Government of the Solomon Islands.

Notes

References
 Anderson, Ewan W. (2003). International Boundaries: A Geopolitical Atlas. Routledge: New York. ;  OCLC 54061586
 Charney, Jonathan I., David A. Colson, Robert W. Smith. (2005). International Maritime Boundaries, 5 vols. Hotei Publishing: Leiden. ; ; ; ; ;  OCLC 23254092

External links
Full text of agreement

1990 in the Solomon Islands
1990 in France
1990 in Oceania
Treaties concluded in 1990
Treaties entered into force in 1990
New Caledonia–Solomon Islands border
Treaties of the Solomon Islands
Boundary treaties
Bilateral treaties of France
1990 in New Caledonia